Alexi Laiho (born Markku Uula Aleksi Laiho; 8 April 1979 – 29 December 2020) was a Finnish guitarist, composer, and vocalist. He was best known as the lead guitarist, lead vocalist and founding member of the melodic death metal band Children of Bodom, and was also the guitarist for Sinergy, the Local Band, Kylähullut, and Bodom After Midnight, which formed just prior to his death. Laiho had previously played with Thy Serpent and Impaled Nazarene on occasion, as well as Warmen and Hypocrisy.

Career
Laiho started playing violin at the age of seven and guitar at the age of eleven. His main guitar influence was Helloween. He then became interested in more extreme, mainly black metal music. By 1999 he considered that his main influences lay with classic metal bands like Manowar, Helloween, Judas Priest and W.A.S.P. 

His first guitar was a "Tokai Stratocaster".

In 1993, after taking part in an experimental band named T.O.L.K. with friends he met while attending the Finnish Pop & Jazz Conservatory, Laiho formed Children of Bodom together with drummer Jaska Raatikainen, under the name of IneartheD.

On 31 October 1997, prior to releasing their debut album, Children of Bodom played their first concert in Helsinki, as opening act for Norway's Dimmu Borgir.

Silenoz, Dimmu Borgir guitarist, on Laiho's first performance: “We could hear the opening band playing from backstage. We were like, ‘Holy shit, what is this?’ It sounded like Yngwie Malmsteen on speed. We ran out and watched the spectacle and stood there with our jaws open”. “There was this fucking beast on the guitar,” adds Dimmu's then-keyboardist Kimberly Goss, who would go on to form power metal band Sinergy with Alexi in 1997, and marry him in 2002. “I was looking at our guitar player like, ‘I don’t know, man, you’ve got some competition…”

Laiho recorded three full-length albums with Sinergy. An unreleased fourth album was recorded and slated to be released in 2005, but the finishing touches were never completed due to Laiho's demanding schedule with Children of Bodom.

In 2004, Laiho founded a side-project called Kylähullut, which was assembled together with drummer Tonmi Lillman (ex-Sinergy) and singer Vesa Jokinen 69er of Finnish punk band Klamydia. The band was created merely for the entertainment of the musicians, and takes a carefree approach to their music. Their discography includes two EP's, and two full-length albums one of which features Laiho's wife, Goss making her debut singing in the Finnish language on the band's self titled song.

Children of Bodom played at the 2008 Metal Hammer Golden Gods Awards. There, Laiho also received the Dimebag Award for "Best Shredder" and performed a track off of Bodom's 2008's album, Blooddrunk.

Laiho appears on Canadian thrash metal outfit Annihilator's 2007 album, Metal, as a guest, performing a guitar solo on the song "Downright Dominate".

On 3 July 2012, Children of Bodom announced on their Facebook page that they had to cancel two European shows because Laiho had been taken to the hospital because of severe stomach pain. The frontman was hospitalized once again the following year in Nashville, leading to speculation about his dangerous relationship with alcohol, which he'd later discuss in multiple interviews.

On 15 December 2019, Children of Bodom played their last show at the Icehall in Helsinki, dubbed "A Chapter Called Children of Bodom"; in November it was announced that after this show, the group would disband after over two decades together. Due to legal reasons, Laiho would no longer be able to continue using the Children of Bodom name.

In March 2020, Laiho would officially announce his new band together with former Children of Bodom guitarist Daniel Freyberg, Bodom After Midnight featuring drummer Waltteri Väyrynen and bassist Mitja Toivonen.

Laiho died on 29 December 2020 due to liver degeneration resulting from years of alcohol abuse, leaving behind a few songs recorded with Bodom After Midnight to be published posthumously. Several months later, Daniel Freyberg told Loudwire that Bodom After Midnight would disband rather than replacing Laiho.

Awards and recognition
Laiho has often been described as a visionary who brought back melody and flamboyance to metal music in a post-grunge and nu metal era. His guitar style was influenced by black metal, power metal and classical music, all cemented together by blistering solos. He was known for his guitar-keyboard solo duels with Janne Wirman, keyboardist in his band Children of Bodom.

Laiho received a Metal Hammer Golden Gods prize in the category of Dimebag Darrell Shredder Award in 2008.

Laiho received widespread acclaim for his guitar work and according to AllMusic, he is "widely celebrated as one of the genre's most accomplished players". In 2004 he was ranked No. 96 out of 100 Greatest Heavy Metal Guitarists of All Time by Guitar World. Guitar World magazine has also ranked him as one of the 50 fastest guitarists in the world. In addition, Roadrunner Records ranked Laiho at No. 41 out of 50 of the greatest metal frontmen. Furthermore, Total Guitar conducted a public voting poll to determine the greatest metal guitarist of all time; Laiho was voted No. 1 out of 20 metal guitarists, with over 20% of the vote.

Personal life and death 

On 1 February 2002, at a private ceremony in Finland, Laiho married long time girlfriend and Sinergy frontwoman Kimberly Goss. They shared identical tattoos of a coiled snake around their ring fingers and had each other's initials tattooed on the upper part of their left arms. According to official documents Laiho filed for divorce in November 2002, but withdrew his application, never to file it again. The couple separated in 2004, but were on good terms and had regular text and video contact until the day he died as confirmed by the Finnish press. Drama and infighting between Laiho's sister and widow resulted in a public back and forth exchange, with both parties airing their grievances to the Finnish media.

For several years after his separation from Goss, Laiho was then linked with Kristen Mulderig, manager of Slayer until mid 2015. Later that same year he began a relationship with Kelli Wright, an Australian public relations manager who he became engaged to in September 2016 and the two married in a traditional handfasting ceremony in December 2017. After Laiho's death it was reported by Finnish news outlets that he had never divorced from Goss, revealing his marriage to Wright was not legally binding.

Laiho had a history of alcohol abuse, which was the cause of his death. In an interview in 2019 he talked about how the pressures of life on the road affected him; he mentioned the song "This Road" from 2019's Hexed and said, "A lot of people thought it was about alcoholism, but it's more about being addicted to being on the road. Sometimes it feels like after 20 years of being on the road, everything just becomes kind of a blur and you don't know what the hell's going on." He explained how he used to drink heavily but cut back in 2013, not drinking while on tour anymore, and mentioned that Hexed first single, "Under Grass and Clover", documented the pain of withdrawal.

On 4 January 2021, a post on his official Facebook page stated Laiho had died the previous week. No official cause of death was given, only stating he succumbed at his Helsinki home to "long-term health issues during his last years". The death date was later confirmed to be 29 December 2020. A private funeral service for Laiho was held on 28 January 2021.

On 5 March 2021 Kimberly Goss revealed the official cause of Laiho's death on her Instagram: "alcohol-induced degeneration of the liver and pancreas connective tissue". Additionally, a mix of painkillers, opioids and insomnia medication was found in his system. The cause of death was originally published in Finnish as "", and a more accurate English translation would be fatty liver disease and pancreatic fibrosis. Laiho's sister stated that the family wanted the details of his death to remain private, however Goss maintained that it was her right as his legal widow to disclose the information and bring closure to his fans, hoping the tragedy could inspire lives to be saved and "help others struggling with these same demons.".

Laiho's ashes were laid to rest on 8 December 2021, one day after a private memorial service was held by Goss.

Discography

Inearthed (Demos)
 1994: Implosion of Heaven
 1995: Ubiguitous Absence of Remission
 1996: Shining

Children of Bodom

 1997: Something Wild
 1999: Hatebreeder
 2000: Follow the Reaper
 2003: Hate Crew Deathroll
 2005: Are You Dead Yet?
 2008: Blooddrunk
 2009: Skeletons in the Closet
 2011: Relentless Reckless Forever
 2013: Halo of Blood
 2015: I Worship Chaos
 2019: Hexed

Sinergy
 1999: Beware the Heavens
 2000: To Hell and Back
 2002: Suicide by My Side

Kylähullut
 2004: Keisarinleikkaus (EP)
 2005: Turpa Täynnä
 2007: Lisää Persettä Rättipäille (EP)
 2007: Peräaukko Sivistyksessä

Impaled Nazarene
 2000: Nihil

Warmen
 2005: Accept the Fact
 2009: Japanese Hospitality
 2014: First of the Five Elements

The Local Band
 2015: Locals Only - Dark Edition (EP)

Bodom After Midnight
 2021: Paint the Sky with Blood (EP)

Guest appearances
 1999: All Eternity – To/Die/For ("In the Heat of the Night") 
 2003: Norther – Dreams of Endless War [guitars in "Youth Gone Wild" cover]
 2003: No Holds Barred – Griffin ("The Sentence", "Bleed")
 2003: Norther – Mirror of Madness [backing vocals on "Dead", "Everything Is An End", "Mirror Of Madness"]
 2003: Klamydia – Seokset (guitar and vocals on "Latomeri")
 2005: Lauri Porra – Lauri Porra ("Solutions")
 2006: Raskaampaa Joulua (Various artists) – [guitar solo on "Petteri Punakuono (Rudolph the Red Nosed Reindeer)"]
 2006: Rytmihäiriö – Seitsemän Surman Siunausliitto [guitar solo on "Pyörillä Kulkeva Kuoleman Enkeli"]
 2006: Stoner Kings – Fuck the World [guitar solo on "Mantric Madness"] (2006)
 2007: Guitar Heroes album – [all guitars and bass on the song "Sioux City Sarsaparilla", and guitar solo on "12 Donkeys"]
 2007: Godsplague – H8 [guitar solo on "Don't Come Back"; backing vocals on "H8"]
 2007: Pain – Psalms of Extinction [guitar solo on "Just Think Again"]
 2007: Annihilator – Metal [guitar solo duel with Jeff Waters on "Downright Dominate"]
 2008: Megadeth Live – Peace Sells [Gigantour 08 live background Vocals]
 2009: Saattue – Vuoroveri [guitar solo on "Vapahtaja"]
 2011: Root (Live) [Additional Guitar] – Adrenaline – Deftones
 2013: Klamydia — Rakas Hullu
 2013: Spirit in the Room — The Killing Moon
 2014: Marty Friedman – Lycanthrope (With Danko Jones)
 2015: Various Artists – Immortal Randy Rhoads – "Mr. Crowley"
 2019: Wednesday 13 — Necrophaze – "Animal"
 2019: Stoner Kings — Alpha Male — "Down to Zero"
 2020: Pyhimys — MIKKO — "Fuck the World"

References

External links
 
 
 

1979 births
2020 deaths
Finnish male composers
Finnish heavy metal guitarists
21st-century Finnish male singers
English-language singers from Finland
Finnish heavy metal singers
Children of Bodom members
People from Espoo
Finnish expatriates in Australia
Finnish expatriates in the United States
Lead guitarists
Sinergy members
The Local Band members
Kylähullut members
20th-century guitarists
21st-century guitarists
Alcohol-related deaths in Finland
20th-century Finnish composers
21st-century Finnish composers